Ballynanty, or Ballynantybeg (Baile Uí Neachtain Beag), is a neighbourhood and electoral district on the north side of Limerick in the mid-west of Ireland.

Sport 
It is home to the North Terrace of Thomond Park stadium, colloquially known as the "Ballynanty End". Ballynanty Rovers is a local association football team.

Amenities 
The local Roman Catholic church, St Lelia's Church, was designed by architect Andrew Devane.

The area is also home to Thomond primary and secondary school.

People 
John Quinn, who has resided in Ballynanty Beg since it was built in the 1950s, became the first resident to hold the Office of Mayor of Limerick City (1992–1993). He represented Ward 4 of the Limerick Electoral District which includes Ballynanty and was initially elected on a Fianna Fáil (FF) ticket in 1979 before joining the newly formed Progressive Democrats (PD) in 1985. He continued to serve on the council until 1999, when he retired from public office.

See also
 List of towns and villages in Ireland

References 

Limerick (city)
Towns and villages in County Limerick